Wales competed at the 2014 Commonwealth Games in Glasgow, Scotland. Prior to the games the Commonwealth Games Council for Wales set itself a target of 27 medals, surpassing the 2010 total of 20 medals won in Delhi. After the withdrawal of World champion competitors Helen Jenkins, Non Stanford and Becky James, Chef de Mission Brian Davies conceded that the initial target was optimistic, but the target was actually attained by 30 July, the sixth day of the competition.  Wales finished 13th in the overall medal table (ranked in order of the number of gold medals won), but joint 8th, with Nigeria, in terms of the total medals won.

Wales finished with 36 medals, making the team the most successful Welsh squad in Commonwealth Games history. The country secured five gold medals, won by Francesca Jones (gymnastics), Geraint Thomas (cycling), Natalie Powell (judo), Jazz Carlin and Georgia Davies (swimming). Francesca Jones was the most successful member of the Welsh squad securing six medals, with five silvers to add to her gold. Other multiple medal athletes includes fellow gymnasts Laura Halford and Georgina Hockenhull, swimmer Jazz Carlin and cyclist Geraint Thomas. Gymnastics was the country's most successful sport winning ten medals, but podium finishes were achieved across ten of the 18 sports contested. Wales medal total also included four from para-sport events.

During the closing ceremony Francesca Jones was awarded the David Dixon Award as the outstanding athlete of the Games, reflecting not only her performance as a competitor but also as a role model to her sport and as an ambassador of fair play.

Administration
The national body created to select the Wales team at the 2014 Commonwealth Games was the Commonwealth Games Council for Wales (CGCW).

The CGCW Board is managed by its Council which is made up of members from all sports that can attend a Commonwealth Games. The chair of the board to see Team Wales through the Games is Helen Phillips, who is also the Chair of Wales Gymnastics. The Company Secretary is Sue Holvey while its directors are Deborah Godbold, Nicola Phillips and Ron Davies. The President of CGCW is Anne Ellis while the CEO is Chris Jenkins, the only full-time employed member of the board.

The chef de mission for Team Wales is Brian Davies, the first time he has held the position after serving on the team in the previous two competitions. Paralympic world record holding athlete Aled Davies was confirmed as team captain at the official team send-off at the Swalec Stadium in Cardiff on 23 June 2014.

Build up to the Games
High Standards were set in the run up to the 2014 Commonwealth Games for the Wales team, with a target of 27 medals set by the Commonwealth Games Council for Wales. This surpassed the team's total achieved at the 2010 Commonwealth Games in Delhi. The first major set back for the team was the withdrawal in June of world triathlete champion Non Stanford, who was unable to recover in time from a stress fracture to her ankle. Two weeks later it was announced that double cycling world champion Becky James would also be withdrawing from the Games, also due to an injury. A week before the Games began triathlete Helen Jenkins, another medal hopeful, was forced to leave the Welsh team, again through injury. Other team members forced to withdraw through injury close to the opening of the Games included weightlifter Faye Pittman and judoka Kyle Davies.

As well as the athletes who left the squad through injury, several hopefuls' withdrawals were more controversial. On 16 July it was announced that 800m runner Gareth Warburton had been charged with anti-doping rule violations and was unable to be selected, this was followed on the opening day of the Games with the withdrawal of 400m hurdler and team Wales vice captain Rhys Williams again after failing a drug test at a Grand Prix event earlier that month.

Further disappointment for Welsh medal hopes came from the boxing team. Olympic silver medalist Fred Evans was unable to compete after long negotiations between the Welsh camp and the Home Office and Games officials resulting in a refusal of accreditation. Earlier in the year Evans had admitted his part in a nightclub assault. A second loss from the boxing team was female fighter Ashley Brace, who was disqualified from taking part in the Games as she was adjudged to have once been a professional kick-boxer and was thus not an amateur fighter.

The loss of so many world class athletes led Chef de Mission Brian Davies to conceded that the initial target of 27 medals was now optimistic.

Medalists

| style="text-align:left; vertical-align:top;"|

Athletics

Men
Track & road events

Field Events

Combined events – Decathlon

Women
Track & road events

Field Events

Badminton

Singles & doubles

Mixed team

Pool D

Boxing

Men

Women

Cycling

Road
Men

Women

Track
Sprint

Pursuit

Points race

Scratch race

Keirin

Gymnastics

Artistic
Men
Team

Individual

Women
Team

Individual

Rhythmic
Individual

Individual finals

Team

Hockey

Men

 David Kettle
 James Kyriakides
 Michael Shaw
 Benjamin Carless
 Peter Swainson
 Richard Gay
 Lewis Prosser
 Liam Brignull
 Matthew Ruxton
 Huw Jones
 Owain Dolan-Gray
 Rhys Gowman
 Nicholas Rees
 Andrew Cornick
 Gareth Furlong
 Daniel Kyriakides

Pool A

Women

 Abi Welsford, forward
 Leah Wilkinson, defender
 Ria Male, goalkeeper
 Katrin Budd, midfielder
 Alys Brooks, midfielder
 Sian French, midfielder
 Sarah Jones, midfielder
 Phoebe Richards, forward
 Elen Barnes, defender
 Beth Bingham, defender
 Carys Tucker, midfielder
 Xenna Hughes, defender
 Eloise Laity, forward
 Emma Batten, forward
 Jo Westwood, defender
 Danni Jordan, forward

Pool B

Judo

Men

Women

Lawn Bowls

Men

Women

Mixed para-sport

Netball

Pool B

Rugby Sevens

 Adam Thomas
 Craig Price
 Iolo Evans
 James Davies
 Jevon Groves
 Luke Treharne
 Lee Williams
 Gareth Davies
 Will Harries
 Gareth Owen
 Luke Morgan
 Alex Webber

Pool stage

Quarter-finals

Shooting

Clay Target
Men

Women

Pistol
Women

Small Bore and Air Rifle
Men

Women

Full Bore

Squash

Individual

Doubles

Swimming

Men

 Ieuan Lloyd finished in equal eighth position in the heats alongside England's Nick Grainger and Ryan Cochrane from Canada. A swim-off was held between the three competitors which Grainger won and was awarded with the eighth and last qualification place in to the final.

Women

* – Indicates athlete swam in the preliminaries but not in the final race.

Table tennis

Singles

Doubles

Team

Triathlon

Mixed Relay

Weightlifting

Men

Women

Wrestling

Freestyle
Men

Women

External links
Glasgow 2014 Commonwealth Games Official site
Team Wales – Team members selected

References

2014
Nations at the 2014 Commonwealth Games